Prakash Vir Shastri (30 December 1923 – 23 November 1977) was a Member of the Parliament of India (Sansad) and was also a leader in the Arya Samaj movement.

Career 
Shastri was born to Dalipsingh Tyagi on 30 December 1923 in the Rehra village of Moradabad district (now in the Amroha district) of Uttar Pradesh. He was politically active as a young man, obtaining an M.A. degree from Agra University, and eventually rising to become Vice-Chancellor of Gurukul Vrindavan. He earned his Shastri degree from Sampurnanand Sanskrit University. In 1958 Shastri was elected to the Lok Sabha as an Independent and until his death continued to serve as an Independent member, first in the Lok Sabha and later in the Rajya Sabha. He was elected as a Jana Sangh nominee in 1974.

Oratory style 
Shastri opposed the official designation of English as the national language of India. He instead preferred Hindi.

Religious activism 
Shastri was also internationally recognised as a devotee of the Arya Samaj movement, a branch of Hinduism dedicated to the Vedas.

Shastri proposed the Religious Protection Bill in March 1960 in the Lok Sabha, which called for the protection of religious minorities in the face of mass conversions by force occurring across the country at the time.

Train accident 
Shastri was killed in a train accident on 23 November 1977. He was survived by his wife and two children.

Speech compilations 
In early 2003, a collection of his parliamentary speeches was compiled for publication, in part by former Deputy Prime Minister Lal Krishna Advani.

References 

1923 births
1977 deaths
People from Amroha district
Arya Samajis
Bharatiya Jana Sangh politicians
Rajya Sabha members from Uttar Pradesh
Lok Sabha members from Uttar Pradesh
India MPs 1957–1962
India MPs 1962–1967
India MPs 1967–1970
Sampurnanand Sanskrit Vishwavidyalaya alumni
Railway accident deaths in India